Derbyshire County Cricket Club in 1922 represents the cricket season when the English club Derbyshire had been playing for fifty-one years. It was their twenty-fourth season in the County Championship and they won six matches to finish eleventh.

1922 season

Derbyshire played all their twenty two first-class games in the County Championship in 1922 and won six, to finish eleventh in the table.

Guy Jackson took over as captain and led Derbyshire for nine seasons "with masterly judgment". Although he was a stern disciplinarian, he earned the respect and affection of his players. When he retired at the end of the 1930 summer he had laid the foundations of the team that won the Championship six years later. Wisden noted "For his work in leading and inspiring the team, Jackson deserves immense thanks. He took over control when the fortunes of the county were at a very low ebb, steadily raised the standard of the cricket, and now retires with Derbyshire well established amongst the leading teams of the day."

There was an occurrence considered unique in county cricket during the season. When Billy Bestwick and Robert Bestwick shared the bowling against Willie Quaife and Bernard Quaife of Warwickshire, father and son were bowling against father and son.

The most significant newcomer for Derbyshire was  Leslie Townsend  a gifted all-rounder who played for seventeen years. Others who made their debut were Repton schoolmaster  John Crommelin-Brown who went on to play several matches over four seasons and footballer Stuart McMillan who appeared intermittently over three seasons. Colin Leech made his only career appearance in the first class game for Derbyshire during the season.

Matches

Statistics

County Championship batting averages

County Championship bowling averages

Wicket Keeper

H Elliott - Catches  30, Stumping 5

See also
Derbyshire County Cricket Club seasons
1922 English cricket season

References

1922 in English cricket
Derbyshire County Cricket Club seasons
English cricket seasons in the 20th century